The following is a list of notable deaths in July 1966.

Entries for each day are listed alphabetically by surname. A typical entry lists information in the following sequence:
 Name, age, country of citizenship at birth, subsequent country of citizenship (if applicable), reason for notability, cause of death (if known), and reference.

July 1966

1 
 Wiri Baker, New Zealand cricketer (b. 1892)
 Pauline Boty, British artist (b. 1938)
 Johnny Bryan, American football player and coach (b. 1897)
 Georg Ehrlich, Austrian-born British sculptor (b. 1897)
 Bill Galvin, Australian politician, member of the Victorian Legislative Assembly (b. 1903)
 Frank Halloran, Australian rules footballer (b. 1912)

2 
 Jan Brzechwa, Polish poet (b. 1900)
 Minnie D. Craig, American politician, Speaker of the North Dakota House of Representatives (b. 1883)
 St. John of Shanghai and San Francisco, Russian Orthodox hierarch and saint (b. 1896)
 Holger Lindberg, Swedish wrestler, competed at the 1920 Summer Olympics (b. 1894)

3 
 Kees Boeke, Dutch pacifist and tax resister (b. 1884)
 Robert Cochrane, English occultist (b. 1931)
 André Gailhard, French composer (b. 1885)
 Eleanor Margaret Green, Princess Viggo, Countess of Rosenborg, American-born Danish princess (b. 1895)
 Paul Conway Leahy, American federal judge (b. 1904)
 Deems Taylor, American composer (b. 1885)

4 
 Dorothy Aldis, American children's author and poet (b. 1896)
 Louis Couffignal, French mathematician (b. 1902)
 Georges Dumont, Canadian politician, member of the Legislative Assembly of New Brunswick (b. 1898)
 Archie Latimer Hodgins, Canadian politician, member of the Canadian House of Commons (b. 1876)
 Otto Lindig, German potter (b. 1895)

5 
 Robin Sutcliffe Allan, New Zealand geologist and university professor (b. 1900)
 Edward Pierrepont Beckwith, American scientist (b. 1877)
 Vinson Allen Collins, American politician, member of the Texas Senate (b. 1867)
 Pete Fox, American baseball player (b. 1909)
 George de Hevesy, Hungarian chemist, Nobel Prize laureate (b. 1885)
 Ole Jørgensen, Norwegian politician, MP (b. 1897)

6 
 Harold Breen, Australian public servant (b. 1893)
 Sad Sam Jones, American baseball player (b. 1892)
 Anne Nagel, American actress (b. 1915)
 Benjamin Horsley Littleton, American federal judge (b. 1889)

7 
 Yoshishige Abe, Japanese philosopher, educator, and statesman in Shōwa period Japan; Minister of Education (b. 1883)
 Carmelita Geraghty, American actress (b. 1901)
 Alberto Gout, Mexican screenwriter and film director (b. 1913)

8 
 Dick Christy, American football player (b. 1935)
 Herbert Elphinstone, Australian cricket umpire (b. 1905)
 Horst Fischer, German war criminal, last person guillotined in Germany (b. 1912)
 James Ernest Karnes, American soldier awarded the Medal of Honor (b. 1889)
 Clyde Lamb, American illustrator and convicted robber (b. 1913)
 William Alexander McKenzie, Canadian politician, member of the Legislative Assembly of British Columbia (b. 1874)
 George Minter, English film producer (b. 1911)

9 
 Sir John Lindsay Dashwood, 10th Baronet, English aristocrat (b. 1896)
 Walter Gerwig, German lutenist (b. 1899)

10 
 Raphaël Etifier, French politician, member of the French senate (b. 1889)
 Gʻafur Gʻulom, Uzbek writer (b. 1903)
 Charles Goethe, American eugenicist (b. 1875)
 Malvina Hoffman, American sculptor (b. 1885)
 Gussy Holl, German actress (b. 1888)

11 
 Billy Butler, English footballer (b. 1900)
 Barney Lutz, American baseball player (b. 1915)
 Delmore Schwartz, American poet (b. 1913)

12 
 Vera Franceschi, American pianist (b. 1926) 
 Leicester Gilbert-Lodge, British philatelist (b. 1882)
 Liangqing, Chinese monk (b. 1896)
 D. T. Suzuki, Japanese philosopher (b. 1870)

13 
 Genica Athanasiou, Romanian-French actress (b. 1897)
 Princess Beatrice of Saxe-Coburg and Gotha, member of the British Royal Family, granddaughter of Queen Victoria (b. 1884)
 Harald Jensen, Danish-born Australian geologist (b. 1879)
 David H. Keller, American writer (b. 1880)
 Reino Ragnar Lehto, Finnish politician, Prime Minister of Finland (b. 1898)
 Eric Macfadyen, British politician, MP (b. 1879)
 Victorio Macho, Spanish sculptor (b. 1887)

14 
 William Hawksworth, New Zealand cricketer (b. 1911)
 Nicolaas de Jong, Dutch cyclist, competed at the 1920 Summer Olympics (b. 1887)
 Nils Lavik, Norwegian politician, Member of the Storting (parliament) (b. 1884)
 Julie Manet, French painter (b. 1878)
 Sigfred Madsen, Danish boxer, competed at the 1936 Summer Olympics (b. 1915)

15 
 Seyfi Arkan, Turkish architect (b. 1903)
 Francis Agar-Robartes, 7th Viscount Clifden, British politician (b. 1883)
 Wilhelm Cornides, Wehrmacht sergeant in World War II, diarist (b. 1920)
 Clarence Gamble, American birth control advocate (b. 1894)
 August Lindberg, Swedish trade unionist (b. 1885)

16 
 Arthur Adamson, Australian rules football player (b. 1882)
 Richard Craig, Canadian politician, member of the Legislative Assembly of Manitoba (b. 1877)
 Agnes Dollan, Scottish suffragist and politician (b. 1887)
 Tom Hammond, Australian rules footballer (b. 1896)
 James Butler Hare, American politician, United States representative from South Carolina (b. 1918)
 Bernhard Schweitzer, German archaeologist (b. 1892)

17 
 August Baeyens, Belgian violist and composer (b. 1895)
 Charles Creed, French-born British fashion designer (b. 1909)
 Nils Dahl, Norwegian runner, competed at the 1908 and 1912 Olympics (b. 1882)
 Albert Freethy, Welsh rugby referee and cricketer (b. 1885)
 Kurt Herlth, German set designer (b. 1896)

18 
 Bobby Fuller, American musician (b. 1942)
 Russell Madden, Australian rules footballer (b. 1910)

19 
 Walter Aitkenhead, Scottish footballer (b. 1887)
 Mary Jobe Akeley, American explorer and author (b. 1878)
 Joaquín Albareda y Ramoneda, Spanish Roman Catholic Cardinal (b. 1892)
 Maxine Albro, American painter, muralist, lithographer, mosaic artist, and sculptor (b. 1903)
 Franz Lahner, Austro-Hungarian flying ace in World War I (b. 1893)
 Hans Ji Maharaj, Indian religious leader (b. 1900)

20 
 Elizabeth Amsden, American operatic soprano and actress (b. 1881)
 Alexander Bazhbeuk-Melikyan, Soviet artist, graphic designer and sculptor (b. 1891)
 Anne Beffort, Luxembourg educator and author (b. 1880)
 Julien Carette, French actor (b. 1897)
 Donald Gee, British theologian (b. 1891)
 Pat Hanley, American football player and coach (b. 1896)
 Józef Kisielewski, Polish politician and writer (b. 1905)

21 
 Francis Stewart Briggs, Australian aviator (b. 1897)
 Francesco Paolo Cantelli, Italian mathematician (b. 1875)
 Philipp Frank, Austrian-born American scientist and philosopher (b. 1884)
 John French, English photographer (b. 1907)
 Julian Hochfeld, Polish Marxist (b. 1911)
A G Street, English farmer, author and broadcaster (b. 1892)

22 
 Vladimir Abrikosov, Russian Catholic priest of the Byzantine rite (b. 1880)
 Lauro Ayestarán, Uruguayan musicologist (b. 1913)
 Berend Carp, Dutch sailor, competed at the 1920 Summer Olympics (b. 1901)
 Harriet Daggett, American law professor (b. 1891)
 Frank Delahanty, American baseball player (b. 1882)
 Edward Gourdin, American long jumper, silver medalist at the 1924 Summer Olympics (b. 1897)
 Pavlos Gyparis, Greek army officer and politician, MP (b. 1882)

23 
 Kurt Albrecht, German military officer during World War II (b. 1895)
 Margaret Bennell, English educator (b. 1893)
 Vito R. Bertoldo, United States Army soldier, Medal of Honor recipient (b. 1916)
 Montgomery Clift, American actor (b. 1920)
 Lo La Chapelle, Dutch footballer, medalist at the 1908 Summer Olympics (b. 1888)
 Douglass Montgomery, American actor (b. 1907)

24 
 Aftimios Ofiesh, American Orthodox bishop (b. 1880)
 George Brook, English cricketer (b. 1888)
 Harry Cobe, American racecar driver (b. 1885)
 Holger J. Jensen, Danish painter (b. 1900)
 Arthur B. Langlie, American politician, Governor of Washington (b. 1900)
 Tony Lema, American golfer (b. 1934)
 José Magnani, Brazilian cyclist, competed at the 1936 Summer Olympics (b. 1913)

25 
 Harold Conradi, Australian rules footballer (b. 1894)
 Francis Edward Faragoh, Austria-Hungary-born American screenwriter (b. 1898)
 Red Green, Canadian ice hockey player (b. 1899)
 Rolf Henne, Swiss Nazi leader (b. 1901)
 Paul Le Drogo, French cyclist (b. 1905)
 Frank O'Hara, American poet (b. 1926)

26 
 Gladstone Adams, British politician; Chairman of Whitley Bay Urban District Council (b. 1880)
 Brenda Sue Brown, American murder victim (b. 1955)
 Jean-Edouard de Castella, Australian-born Swiss artist (b. 1881)
 Augustine Duffy, Canadian politician, member of the Newfoundland House of Assembly (b. 1905)
 Howard Kinsey, American tennis player (b. 1899)
 Maura Laverty, Irish writer (b. 1907)
 Lee Lescaze, American journalist (b. 1909)

27 
 Edward Carey Francis, English mathematician and Christian missionary to Kenya (b. 1897)
 Sir Norman Gregg, Australian ophthalmologist (b. 1892)
 Hugo von Heidenstam, Swedish diplomat, ambassador to Iran and Iraq (b. 1884)
 Sir Reginald Kennedy-Cox, English dramatist and social reformer (b. 1881)

28 
 Josef von Báky, Hungarian filmmaker (b. 1902)
 Judd Conlon, American vocal arranger and conductor (b. 1910) 
 Hal Dixon, American baseball umpire (b. 1920)
 David Jones, American businessman, owner of the Chicago Cardinals (b. 1884)
 Liem Bwan Tjie, Indonesian architect (b. 1891)

29 
 Maj. Gen. Johnson Aguiyi-Ironsi, Nigerian military figure and Head of State of Nigeria (b. 1924)
 Russell Clark, New Zealand artist (b. 1905)
Edward Gordon Craig, English theatre practitioner (b. 1872).
Jerry Dennerlein, American football player (b. 1915).
 Harold Egan, Australian rules footballer (b. 1884)
 Adekunle Fajuyi, Nigerian soldier, first military governor of the Western Region, Nigeria (b. 1926)
Billy Fogg, English footballer (b. 1903).
 Raja Mehdi Ali Khan, Indian poet and writer (b. 1928)
 John Lemmon, British logician (b. 1930)
 Ian Gordon Lindsay, Scottish architect (b. 1906)

30 
 Hazel Abel, American teacher and politician; United States Senator (b. 1888)
 George Ford, Australian politician, member of the New South Wales Legislative Council (b. 1907)
 Gen. Otto Fretter-Pico, German general during World War II (b. 1893)
 Sir Donald Gainer, British diplomat, Ambassador to Venezuela, Brazil, and Poland (b. 1891) 
 Harry Hedgpeth, American baseball player (b. 1888)
 František Kříž, Czech fencer, competed at the 1912 and 1928 Summer Olympics (b. 1884)
 Marcella Lindh, American opera singer (b. 1867)

31 
 Andrej Bagar, Slovak film actor (b. 1900)
 Chester R. Davis, American businessman, Assistant Secretary of the Army (b. 1896)
 Alexander von Falkenhausen, German general (b. 1878)
 Lydia Locke, American opera singer (b. 1884)
 Bud Powell, American jazz pianist (b. 1924)

References

1966-07
July 1966 events